André Silva may refer to:

Sportspeople

Association football
André Silva (footballer, born February 1980), Brazilian football midfielder
André Silva (footballer, born April 1980), Brazilian football defensive midfielder
André Silva Gomes (born 1973), Brazilian footballer who played for Grêmio, Vasco da Gama, and Ponte Preta
André Silva (footballer, born 1995), Portuguese football striker for RB Leipzig
André Silva (footballer, born 1997), Brazilian football winger for Arouca

Rugby
André Silva (rugby union, born 1975), French-born Portuguese rugby union player
André Silva (rugby union, born 1988), played for Brazil at the 2015 Pan American Games

Other sports
André Silva (handballer), Brazilian handballer, playing for Handebol Clube Taubaté
André Silva (table tennis), Portuguese table tennis player, playing for Sporting Clube de Portugal
André da Silva (born 1972), Brazilian track athlete

Other people
André da Silva Gomes (1752–1844), Portuguese-Brazilian composer
André Lourenço e Silva (born 1976), Portuguese politician

See also
Paulo Silva (volleyball) (Paulo André Jukoski da Silva, born 1963), Brazilian volleyballer
Pinga (footballer, born 1981) (André Luciano da Silva, born 1981), Brazilian footballer
Sandro André da Silva (born 1974), former Brazilian footballer
Fábio André da Silva (born 1990), Swiss footballer
Luís André da Silva (born 1972), former Brazilian footballer
Andrés Silva (born 1986), Uruguayan track athlete
André Ramalho (André Ramalho Silva, born 1992), Brazilian footballer
André Clóvis (André Clóvis Silva Filho, born 1997), Brazilian footballer